Conrad Maurentius Carlsrud (9 February 1884 – 21 October 1973) was a Norwegian gymnast and track and field athlete who competed in the 1906 Intercalated Games and in the 1908 Summer Olympics.

At the 1906 Intercalated Games in Athens, he was a member of the Norwegian gymnastics team, which won the gold medal in the team, Swedish system event. Two years later he won the silver medal as part of the Norwegian team in the gymnastics team event. His result in the individual competition is unknown.

He also participated in javelin throw. In 1906 he finished eighth in the javelin competition. Two years later he competed in the freestyle javelin event but his result is unknown.

References

External links
 Database Olympics profile

1884 births
1973 deaths
Norwegian male artistic gymnasts
Norwegian male javelin throwers
Olympic gymnasts of Norway
Olympic athletes of Norway
Olympic gold medalists for Norway
Olympic silver medalists for Norway
Olympic medalists in gymnastics
Medalists at the 1906 Intercalated Games
Medalists at the 1908 Summer Olympics
Gymnasts at the 1906 Intercalated Games
Gymnasts at the 1908 Summer Olympics
Athletes (track and field) at the 1906 Intercalated Games
Athletes (track and field) at the 1908 Summer Olympics
20th-century Norwegian people